Remedy is None is the debut novel by the Scottish writer William McIlvanney, first published in 1966, and republished in 2014.

The novel won the Geoffrey Faber Memorial Prize in 1967.

References

1966 British novels
Scottish novels
Novels by William McIlvanney
1966 debut novels
Eyre & Spottiswoode books